Midlum may refer to the following:

Places
Germany
Midlum, Schleswig-Holstein
Midlum, Lower Saxony

Netherlands
Midlum, Netherlands

Vehicles
Renault Midlum, a truck made by Renault